N-apostrophe (ŉ) is a Unicode code point for the Afrikaans language of South Africa and Namibia. The code point (U+0149) is currently deprecated, and the Unicode standard recommends that a sequence of an apostrophe followed by n be used instead, as the use of deprecated characters such as ŉ is "strongly discouraged", despite being required for CP853 compatibility. In fact, it was removed from the Charis SIL and Doulos SIL fonts. It is however in quite general use in the Afrikaans versions of Facebook and other publications, probably to avoid the tendency of auto-correction (designed for English quotation marks) to turn a typed ′n into ‘n which is incorrect but common.

Grammar 
The letter is the indefinite article of Afrikaans, and is pronounced as a schwa.  The symbol itself came about as a contraction of its Dutch equivalent  meaning "one" (just as English an comes from Anglo-Saxon ān, also meaning "one").
Dit is ŉ boom.

It is a tree.

When ŉ comes before a vowel, it may be pronounced the same as English an. This pronunciation is not common at all and may be limited to older speakers – in general, the pronunciation mentioned above is used in all cases. 
Dit is ŉ appel.
 (also )
This is an apple.

In Afrikaans, ŉ is never capitalised in standard texts.  Instead, the first letter of the following word is capitalised.
ŉ Mens is hier.
A person is here.

An exception to this rule is in newspaper headlines, or sentences and phrases where all the letters are capitalised.
’N NASIONALE NOODTOESTAND
A NATIONAL EMERGENCY SITUATION

Miscellaneous 
The upper case, or majuscule form has never been included in any international keyboards. Therefore, it is decomposable by simply combining ʼ (U+02BC) and N. 〔ʼN〕

It is also a legacy compatibility character for the ISO/IEC 6937 and CP853 text encodings.

See also 
Afrikaans
Afrikaans grammar

References

Latin letters with diacritics
Afrikaans words and phrases